Cajetan and Kajetan is the Anglicized, Germanized and Slavicized form of the Italian given name Gaetano. People with this name include:

 Thomas Cajetan (1469–1534), Italian Dominican theologian, cardinal, and opponent of Martin Luther
 Saint Cajetan (Gaetano dei Conti di Thiene; 1480–1547), canonized saint
 Constantino Cajetan (1560–1650), Italian Benedictine scholar
 Cajetan Tschink (1763–1813), Austrian writer and philosopher
 Baron Cajetan von Felder (1814–1894), Austrian lawyer, entomologist and liberal politician
 Karl Kajetan von Gaisruck (1769–1846), Austrian archbishop
 Kajetan Garbiński (1796–1847), Polish mathematician
 Josef Kajetán Tyl (1808–1856), Czech dramatist and author of lyrics of the Czech anthem
 Cajetan, pseudonym of the Austrian physician and illustrator Anton Elfinger (1821–1864)
 Kajetan von Mérey (1861–1931), Austro-Hungarian diplomat
 Kajetan Stefanowicz (1886–1920), Polish Art-Nouveau painter and illustrator
 Kajetan Mühlmann (1898–1958), Austrian art historian and officer in the SS
 Cajetan J. B. Baumann (1899–1969), Franciscan architect
 Kajetan Kovič (1931–2014), Slovene poet, writer, translator, and journalist
 Kajetan Duszyński (born 1995), Polish sprinter

See also 

 Caetani (surname)